William Roger Webb was born in Bristow, Oklahoma on April 28, 1941. He was the  president of the University of Central Oklahoma, in Edmond, Oklahoma, until 2011 and the president and the chairman of the board of directors of the American Association of State Colleges and Universities.

Biography
In 1959, Webb graduated from Heavener High School. The following year he attended Oklahoma State University and in 1963 Graduated with a B.A. That year he took a job working for the Office of the Secretary of the U.S. Senate in Washington, D.C. In 1967, Webb was granted his Juris Doctor from the University of Oklahoma.

In 1970 he was employed at the Oklahoma Public Safety Department. During this time he was an adjunct Physical Education Lecturer at UCO. In 1974 he served as Commissioner of the DPS. In 1978 Webb became the 14th president of Northeastern State University in Tahlequah, Oklahoma. During his time at NSU he was named to the Oklahoma Higher Education Hall of Fame.

In 1997, he became the 19th President of the University of Central Oklahoma succeeding George Nigh in that post. Two years later he was elected to the Board of Directors in the American Association of State Colleges and Universities, an organization of which he is now the President and Chairman of the Board of Directors.

Personal life
He is currently married to Jeanie, who is president of Rose State College.

References

Presidents of Northeastern State University
American Association of State Colleges and Universities
Presidents of the University of Central Oklahoma
1941 births
Living people
University of Oklahoma alumni